Autarotis polioleuca is a moth in the family Crambidae. It was described by Turner in 1911. It is found in Australia, where it has been recorded from Queensland.

References

Crambinae
Moths described in 1911
Moths of Australia
Taxa named by Alfred Jefferis Turner